Eva Darren (born June 28, 1946) is a Filipino actress.

Career
Darren started appearing in movies during the early 1960s. She won the FAMAS Award for Best Supporting Actress for the movie Ang Pulubi (1969) starring Charito Solis.

In 1998, she was nominated for Gawad Urian Best Supporting Actress in the movie Ligaya Ang Itawag Mo Sa Akin (1997) starring Rosanna Roces. Her memorable mother role was in the hit ABS-CBN's TV series Pangako Sa 'Yo (2000), where she played the adoptive mother of Kristine Hermosa. She appeared as fortuneteller in Sineserye Presents: Patayin Sa Sindak si Barbara (2008) with Kris Aquino as Barbara.
 
She was part of the movie Ate in 2008, which stars the sisters Ara Mina and Cristine Reyes.

Awards and nominations
1998 Nominated Gawad Urian Award Best Supporting Actress Ligaya Ang Itawag Mo Sa Akin (1997)
1970 Won FAMAS Award Best Supporting Actress Ang Pulubi (The Beggar) (1969)
1969 Won Manila Film Festival Best Supporting Actress Ang Pulubi (The Beggar) (1969)
1969 Nominated FAMAS Award Best Supporting Actress Igorota (1968)
1968 Nominated FAMAS Award Best Supporting Actress Ang Langit Sa Lupa (1967)

Filmography

Television
{| class="wikitable"
! Year !! Title !! Role
|-
| 2018 || Kadenang Ginto || Cecilia Mangubat
|- 
| 2017 || The Promise of Forever || Lola Faye Zialcita
|- 
| rowspan=2 | 2016 || Maalaala Mo Kaya: Anino || Maring
|-
| Wish I May || Mamita Linsangan
|-
| 2015 || The Rich Man's Daughter || Isabeli Tanchingco 
|-
| rowspan="2"| 2014 || Ipaglaban Mo: Amin Ang Pamana Mo || Lola Cecilia
|-
| Carmela || Lola Wagay
|-
| rowspan="3"| 2013 || Maalaala Mo Kaya: Double Bass || Josie
|-
| Maalaala Mo Kaya: Picture Frame || Rosario
|-
| Kakambal ni Eliana || Aurora Cascavel
|-
| rowspan="5"| 2012 || Kung Ako'y Iiwan Mo || Madame Almira
|-
| Wansapanataym: Yaya Yaya Puto Maya || Old Woman 
|-
| Maalaala Mo Kaya: Gong || Apo 
|-
| Wako Wako || Guest 
|-
| Maalaala Mo Kaya: Baunan || Lola 
|-
| 2011 || Maalaala Mo Kaya: TV || Concordia 
|-
| rowspan="4"| 2010 || My Driver Sweet Lover || Sor Aguida
|-
| Maalaala Mo Kaya: Pinwheel || Piling
|-
| Bantatay || Vangie
|-
| Rubi || Mameng
|-
| rowspan="5"| 2009 || Maalaala Mo Kaya: Tsinelas || 
|-
| May Bukas Pa || Helen 
|-
|  Maalaala Mo Kaya: Bisikleta || Maria 
|-
| Jim Fernandez's Kambal Sa Uma || Lola Salve 
|-
| Maalaala Mo Kaya: Chess || Rowspan="2"| Guest 
|-
| rowspan="5"| 2008 || Your Song Presents: Kapag Ako Ay Nagmahal  
|-
| Maalaala Mo Kaya: Kanin || Prisoner 
|-
| Sineserye Presents: Patayin Sa Sindak Si Barbara || Elsa Magbintang  
|-
| Maalaala Mo Kaya: Robot || Guest 
|-
| Maalaala Mo Kaya: Hair Clip || Lola 
|-
| rowspan="3"| 2007 || Sineserye Presents: Hiram Na Mukha || Azon 
|-
| Mars Ravelo's Lastikman || Guest 
|-
| Komiks Presents: Pedro Penduko at ang mga Engkantao || Azon 
|-
| 2006 || Now And Forever: Linlang || Sister Stella
|-
| rowspan="3"| 2005 || Now And Forever: Ganti || Nenita 
|-
| Carlo J. Caparas' Ang Panday || Nana Selo
|-
| Magpakailanman: The Jose & Perlita Claro Story || Guest
|-
| 2003 || Darating ang Umaga || Olinda
|-
| rowspan="2"| 2000 || Munting Anghel || Intiang
|-
| Pangako Sa 'Yo || Belen Macaspac
|-
| rowspan="2"| 1999 || Marinella || Editha
|-
| Wansapanataym: Madyik Sandok || Aling Ganting
|-
| 1997 || Mula sa Puso || Josefina "Pining" Miranda
|-
| 1995 || Maalaala Mo Kaya: Lupa || Selma 
|-
| 1994 || Maalaala Mo Kaya: Dancing Shoes || Lydia 
|-
| 1963 || Hiwaga sa Bahay na Bato || Linda
|}

Movies
 Kasal (2018) as Lola Rowena
 Everyday I Love You (2015) as Lola Marivic
 Ate (2008)
 A Love Story (2007)
 Silip (2007)
 Paraiso: Tatlong Kwento ng Pag-asa (2007)
 All About Love (2006)
 Bikini Open (2005)
 Sugatang Puso (2001)
 Mila (2001)
 Resbak: Babalikan Kita! (1999)
 Kahapon, May Dalawang Bata (1999)
 Mula Sa Puso: The Movie (1999)
 Armadong Hudas (1998) 
 Kay Tagal Kang Hinintay (1998)
 Tatlo... Magkasalo (1998)
 Curacha: Ang Babaeng Walang Pahinga (1998)
 Mapusok (1998)
 Ang Lalaki sa Buhay ni Selya (1997)
 Ligaya Ang Itawag Mo Sa Akin (1997)
 Kailanman (1996)
 Shake, Rattle & Roll V (1994)
 Sana Kahit Minsan (1992)
 Anak Ni Baby Ama (1990)
 Nakagapos Na Puso (1986)
 Tag-ulan Sa Tag-araw (1975)
 Apoy Sa Madaling Araw (1971)
 Igorota (1968)
 Crossfire (1966)
 Kulog At Kidlat (1965)
 Larawan Ng Pag-ibig (1964)
 Aninong Bakal'' (1963)

References

External links

1946 births
Living people
Filipino film actresses
Filipino television actresses